Colby High School is a public secondary school located in Colby, Wisconsin. It is located on the Clark County border with Marathon County, and CHS serves about 300 students from both Clark and Marathon counties.

Academics
Colby High School offers Advanced Placement courses, of which approximately a quarter of the student body takes part in.

Demographics

Athletics
The Colby athletic teams are nicknamed the Hornets and compete in the Cloverbelt Conference. Hornet football teams won WIAA Division 5 state titles in 1998, 2008 and 2011.

Performing arts
Colby has two competitive show choirs, the mixed-gender Coalition and the women's-only Hornettes. The choirs also host the annual Central Wisconsin Show Choir Spectacular competition, which was named the best regional competition in America in 2018.

References

External links
 School District Website
 WIAA Website

Schools in Clark County, Wisconsin
Public high schools in Wisconsin